Robert Dover may refer to:

Robert Dover (Cotswold Games) (1575/82–1652), English captain and attorney; founder of the Cotswold Olimpick Games
Robert Dover (equestrian) (born 1956), American Olympic horse rider
Robert Dover (Nebraska politician), member of the Nebraska Legislature from the 19th District